Gabriel is a surname of English, French, German, Spanish, and Filipino origin.

Arts 

Ada Vorhaus Gabriel (1898–1975), American artist
Alfons Gabriel (1894–1975), Austrian geographer and travel writer
Andrea Gabriel (born 1978), American actress
Ange-Jacques Gabriel (1698–1782), French architect
Caroline Sylvia Gabriel (1912–1997), British artist
Charles H. Gabriel (1856–1932), writer of gospel songs and composer of gospel music
Ethel Gabriel (1921–2021), one of America's first female music record producers
Edith Mabel Gabriel (1882–1972), British sculptor
Gene Gabriel (born 1970), Cuban-American actor
George Gabriel (born 1971), a multi-instrumentalist, composer, and musician
Gilbert Gabriel, African-English multi-instrumental musician and lyricist
Gunter Gabriel (1942–2017), German singer and composer
Jacques Gabriel (1667–1742), French architect
Jacques Gabriel (painter) (1934–1988), Haitian painter
John Gabriel (actor) (1931–2021), American actor
Josh Gabriel, an electronic dance music DJ and producer
Juan Gabriel (1950–2016), Mexican singer and songwriter
Louis Gabriel (1857–1927), full name Charles Louis Gabriel, Australian photographer and medical practitioner
Maddison Gabriel (born 1994), Australian model
Marius Gabriel (born 1954), romance and mystery writer, artist and musician
Mike Gabriel (born 1954), American animator and film director
Pascal Gabriel (born 1856), Belgian-born musician based in London
Peter Gabriel (born 1950), English musician and singer
Ralph Henry Gabriel (1890–1987), American historian and writer
Ruth Gabriel (born 1975), Spanish actress
Sargon Gabriel (born 1947), Assyrian musician
Seychelle Gabriel (born 1991), American film and television actress and singer
Thomas Gabriel (composer) (born 1957), German organist and composer

Politics 
Brigitte Gabriel (born 1964), Lebanese American journalist, author, activist 
Charles A. Gabriel (1928–2003), Chief of Staff of the United States Air Force
Hiram Gabriel (1825–1918), American politician
James Gabriel, Canadian Mohawk politician
Mariya Gabriel, (born 1979), Bulgarian politician
Mark A. Gabriel, writer on Islamic affairs
Philip Gabriel, American professor and translator from Japanese
Sigmar Gabriel (born 1959), German politician and former chairman of the Social Democratic Party of Germany

Sports 

Christian Gabriel (born 1975), German chess grandmaster
Dillon Gabriel (born 2001), American football player
Doug Gabriel (born 1980), American football player
Jan C. Gabriel (1940–2010), a Chicago-area motorsport announcer
Ján Gabriel (born 1962), Slovak professional footballer
Jimmy Gabriel (1940–2021), Scottish football midfielder
John Gabriel (basketball), an executive in the National Basketball Association
Justin Gabriel (born 1981), a South African professional wrestler
Kurtis Gabriel (born 1993), Canadian ice hockey player
Petr Gabriel (born 1973), Czech footballer
Roman Gabriel (born 1940), American football player
Shannon Gabriel (born 1988), Trinidadian cricketer
Taylor Gabriel (born 1991), American football player
Tony Gabriel (born 1948), a Canadian football player

Others 

Eric Gabriel (1927–2015), British mechanical engineer
James N. Gabriel (1923–1991), American lawyer and judge
R'Bonney Gabriel (born 1994), American fashion designer, model and beauty queen of Miss Universe 2022 
Richard P. Gabriel (born 1949), American computer programmer
Siegmund Gabriel (1851–1924), German chemist
Yohannan Gabriel (1758–1833), Chaldean bishop of Salmas from 1795 to 1833
Willi Gabriel (1893–1968), German World War I flying ace

See also
Gabriel (given name)
Gibril (disambiguation)
Jibril (disambiguation) 

Surnames from given names